George Benson (1919–2004) was an American politician from Seattle. He was a five-time elected member of the Seattle City Council from 1974 to 1994. Benson had a reputation for being a community advocate and insider due to his background, activism, and activity in city council.

While he was on city council, Benson advocated for transit options. His major project was establishing the Waterfront Streetcar, which was later named in his honor.

Benson was born in Minnesota but moved to Seattle in 1938. He graduated from the University of Washington School of Pharmacy in 1950. While he was there he met Evelyn, whom he married. Benson interacted with the pharmacy school throughout his life.

References

Seattle City Council members
1919 births
2004 deaths